Shane Frith is a New Zealand politician and political activist. He is director of the Brussels-based think tank New Direction. He was director of Progressive Vision, a classical liberal think tank in London, and managing director of the Stockholm Network, an international network of classical liberal think tanks.

In his native New Zealand, Frith was president of the Young Nationals from 1991 to 1995. Firth contested the Otara electorate in 1993. Frith was chairman of the International Young Democrat Union from 2002 to 2004.

Footnotes

New Zealand National Party politicians
International Young Democrat Union chairs
Living people
Unsuccessful candidates in the 1996 New Zealand general election
Unsuccessful candidates in the 1993 New Zealand general election
Year of birth missing (living people)